This is a listing of all theatrical animated shorts released by Warner Bros. under the Looney Tunes and Merrie Melodies banners between 1970 and the present. It also lists shorts originally planned for theatrical release and other shorts that were not feature films, television series, or television specials.

A total of 38 animated shorts have been released since 1970.

1970–present

Theatrical cartoons

General theatrical releases

Limited releases

Originally planned for theatrical release

Premiered on television

Premiered on home video 
All cartoons were produced by Sander Schwartz and Larry Doyle, with the exception of Daffy Duck for President, which was produced by Spike Brandt and Tony Cervone. There were several shorts planned and storyboarded in 2004 but all of them were canceled due to the box-office failure of Looney Tunes: Back in Action.

Miscellaneous Looney Tunes shorts

Made-for-TV cartoons 

{|class="wikitable sortable"
|-
! scope="col" style="width: 150px;" | Title
! scope="col" style="width: 100px;" | Director
! scope="col" style="width: 150px;" | Characters
! scope="col" style="width: 100px;" | Release date
! scope="col" style="width: 150px;" | DVD & Blu-ray availability
!Notes
|-
|Bugs Bunny's Christmas Carol
|Friz Freleng
|Bugs, Elmer, Foghorn, Pepé, Petunia, Porky, Sam, Sylvester, Tweety
| rowspan="3" |
| rowspan="2" |LTGC Volume 5, Disc 4 (special feature)
|rowspan="3"|
 Edited from the CBS TV special Bugs Bunny's Looney Christmas Tales
 Bugs Bunny's Christmas Carol and Freeze Frame were re-branded as Merrie Melodies shorts
|-
|Freeze Frame|
|Wile E. Coyote and the Road Runner
|-
|Fright Before Christmas|Friz Freleng
|Bugs, Taz, Clyde, Speedy
|LTGC Volume 5, Disc 4 (special feature),Looney Tunes Platinum Collection: Volume 1|-
|The Yolk's on You|Tony BenedictGerry ChiniquyArt DavisDave Detiege
|Daffy, Foghorn, Prissy, Sylvester
| rowspan="3" |April 1, 1980
|LTGC Volume 6, Disc 1 (special feature),The Essential Daffy Duck (special feature)
|rowspan="3"|
 Edited from the NBC TV special Daffy Duck's Easter Special The Yolk's on You and Daffy Flies North were re-branded as Merrie Melodies shorts
|-
|The Chocolate Chase|Friz Freleng
|Daffy, Speedy
|LTGC Volume 6, Disc 1 (special feature), 4 Classic Cartoons promotional DVD,The Essential Daffy Duck (special feature)
|-
|Daffy Flies North|Tony BenedictGerry ChiniquyArt DavisDave Detiege
|Daffy
|LTGC Volume 6, Disc 1 (special feature),The Essential Daffy Duck (special feature)
|-
|Portrait of the Artist as a Young Bunny| rowspan="3" |Chuck Jones
|Bugs, Elmer, Wile E. Coyote and Road Runner (cameo)
| rowspan="3" |May 21, 1980
|LTGC Volume 5, Disc 4 (special feature)The Essential Bugs Bunny (special feature)
|rowspan="3"|
 Edited from the CBS TV special Bugs Bunny's Bustin' Out All Over Soup or Sonic was re-branded as a Merrie Melodies short
|-
|Spaced Out Bunny|Bugs, Marvin, Hugo
|LTGC Volume 5, Disc 4 (special feature),The Essential Bugs Bunny (special feature)Looney Tunes Platinum Collection: Volume 1|-
|Soup or Sonic|Wile E. and Road Runner
|LTGC Volume 5, Disc 4 (special feature)The Essential Bugs Bunny (special feature)
|-
|Daffy & Porky in the William Tell Overture|Dan Haskett
|Daffy, Porky
|2006
|LTGC Volume 4, Disc 2 (special feature)
|
 Edited from the 1991 television special Bugs Bunny's Overtures to Disaster Branded as a Merrie Melodies short on the end card
|-
|}

 Other shorts 

 Webtoons 

The following Flash animation shorts were released onto the official Looney Tunes website between 2001 and 2005. Two collections were released on home video in 2003, Stranger than Fiction and Reality Check.Commercials
The following Flash animation shorts were also released onto the official Looney Tunes website.
 "Anvil-O's" (cereal)
 "Caves" (parody of MTV Cribs)
 "D.I.P.S. (Department of Investigations of Paranormal Sightings)"
 "Da Beepo" (2002) (Road Runner's psychic hotline)
 "The Law Firm of Duck, Duck, McKimson & Duck" (law firm)
 "Elmer Fudd's Extreme Wabbit Hunt Wampage 3: Elmer's Wevenge" (2001) (video game)
 "Looney Tunes Cruise Lines"
 "Porky's Pizza Palace"
 "Stone Cold Duck"
 "50/50" (20/20 parody)
 "Twick or Tweety"

 References 

 Further reading 
 Looney Tunes and Merrie Melodies: A Complete Illustrated Guide to the Warner Bros. Cartoons, by Jerry Beck and Will Friedwald (1989), Henry Holt, 
 Chuck Amuck : The Life and Times of an Animated Cartoonist by Chuck Jones, published by Farrar Straus & Giroux, 
 That's Not All, Folks! by Mel Blanc, Philip Bashe. Warner Books,  (Softcover)  (Hardcover)
 Of Mice and Magic: A History of American Animated Cartoons'', Leonard Maltin, Revised Edition 1987, Plume  (Softcover)  (Hardcover)

External links 
 The Big Cartoon DataBase entry for Merrie Melodies Cartoons and for Looney Tunes Cartoons
 Golden Age Cartoons' The Ultimate Looney Tunes and Merrie Melodies Website by Jon Cooke
 Official site

 
 
Slapstick films